Konardan (also Romanized as Konārdān; also known as Konārdun) is a village in Jaydasht Rural District, in the Central District of Firuzabad County, Fars Province, Iran. At the 2006 census, its population was 74, in 17 families.

References 

Populated places in Firuzabad County